The Catholic Church in Monaco is part of the worldwide Catholic Church, under the spiritual leadership of the Pope in Rome.

The country forms a single archdiocese: the Roman Catholic Archdiocese of Monaco, which is part of the Catholic Church in France since the beginning of its history. Per the Constitution of Monaco (Art. 9) Catholicism is the official church of Monaco, and is the majority religion.
Religious freedom is also guaranteed by the constitution.

Cathedral of Our Lady Immaculate is the cathedral of the Monaco archdiocese. Other Catholic churches include the Saint Charles Church, Church St. Devote, Saint Martin Church, and Saint Nicholas Church. Catholic chapels include the Chapel of Mercy, Chapel of the Sacred Heart, and the Carmelite Chapel. The former Chapel of Visitation is now an art museum.

References

External links
Archdiocese of Monaco official website

 
Monaco
Monaco